Charles Collins Andaku (born 22 November 1965) is an Anglican bishop in Uganda: he has been the Bishop of Madi and West Nile since 2017.

Early life and education
Andaku, was born on 22 November 1965 in Kibigoro, Arua District, Uganda. His parents were Rev Canon Semi Draku and Racheal Draku. He received a Bachelor of Education from Makerere University in 1999. He received his Master in Divinity from Uganda Christian University.

Ordination and career
Andaku was ordained as deacon in 2005 and priest in 2006. He was a Canon at Emmanuel Cathedral, Mvara prior to his consecration. His Madi and West Nile diocese covers Arua, Moyo, Maracha, Yumbe, Koboko and Adjumani districts.

References

Ugandan educators
Uganda Christian University alumni
Anglican bishops of Madi and West Nile
21st-century Anglican bishops in Uganda
Living people
1965 births
People from Arua District